The 2012 CAF Champions League knock-out stage matches took place between October and November 2012. The matches were held from 5–7 October (semifinals first leg), 19–21 October (semifinals second leg), 2–4 November (final first leg) and 16–18 November (final second leg).

All knock-out ties were decided over two legs, with aggregate goals used to determine the winner. If the sides were level on aggregate after the second leg, the away goals rule applied, and if still level, the tie proceeded directly to a penalty shootout (no extra time is played).

Qualified teams
The knock-out stage featured four teams: the two group winners and the two group runners-up from the group stage. In the semi-finals, the group A winners played the group B runners-up, and the group B winners played the group A runners-up. In both ties, the group winners hosted the second leg at home.

Semifinals

ES Tunis won 1–0 on aggregate and advanced to the 2012 CAF Champions League Final.

Al-Ahly won 4–3 on aggregate and advanced to the 2012 CAF Champions League Final.

Final

Al-Ahly won 3–2 on aggregate.

References

External links
CAF Champions League

Knock-out stage